John Drummond Solomon (12 November 1903 – 23 February 1981) was a New Zealand rower who competed in the 1932 Summer Olympics. He was a member of the New Zealand crew which finished fourth in the coxed four competition and was also in the eight's crew which was eliminated in the repêchage of the eight competition.

Solomon was born in Port Chalmers. He died on 23 February 1981.

References 

1903 births
1981 deaths
New Zealand male rowers
Olympic rowers of New Zealand
Rowers at the 1932 Summer Olympics